Warlords of Utopia is an original novel by Lance Parkin set in the Faction Paradox universe.

Parkin developed the idea for a Doctor Who book that was not published. The published version is his second attempt to write it for Faction Paradox. The first was turned down by editor Lawrence Miles.

Plot introduction
The glorious Roman Empire has ruled for nearly 27 centuries when Marcus Americanius Scriptor acquires a strange bracelet from a mysterious stranger. With the bracelet, he finds that he is able to travel to alternate Romes in worlds where the course of history has diverged from the one with which he is familiar. Worlds he finds later have no Roman Empire at all, and a cruel new regime in Germania on a path of conquest. That leads to a conflict between all the parallel universes in which Rome never fell and all those in which the Nazis won World War II.

See also

 Agent of Byzantium
 Germanicus trilogy
 Gunpowder Empire
 Lest Darkness Fall
 Roma Eterna
 Romanitas

References

External links
Official Preview to the novel

Faction Paradox
2004 British novels
Novels by Lance Parkin
Alternate history novels set in ancient Rome